Pentanisia is a genus of flowering plants in the family Rubiaceae.

Species
The genus contains about 19 species.
 Pentanisia angustifolia (Hochst.) Hochst.
 Pentanisia annua K.Schum.
 Pentanisia arenaria (Hiern) Verdc.
 Pentanisia calcicola Verdc.
 Pentanisia confertifolia (Baker) Verdc.
 Pentanisia foetida Verdc.
 Pentanisia gossweileri (Verdc.) Kårehed & B.Bremer
 Pentanisia longipedunculata Verdc.
 Pentanisia longituba (Franch.) Oliv.
 Pentanisia microphylla (Franch.) Chiov.
 Pentanisia monticola (K.Krause) Verdc.
 Pentanisia ouranogyne S.Moore
 Pentanisia procumbens R.D.Good
 Pentanisia prunelloides (Klotzsch) Walp.
 Pentanisia renifolia Verdc.
 Pentanisia rubricaulis (K.Schum.) Kårehed & B.Bremer
 Pentanisia schweinfurthii Hiern
 Pentanisia sykesii Hutch.
 Pentanisia veronicoides (Baker) K.Schum.

References

External links
Pentanisia in the World Checklist of Rubiaceae

Rubiaceae genera
Knoxieae